Senogaster  is a genus of hoverfly in the family Syrphidae.

Species
Senogaster dentipes (Fabricius, 1787)

References

Eristalinae
Hoverfly genera
Diptera of South America
Taxa named by Pierre-Justin-Marie Macquart